Worship Me or Die!  (1987) is the debut studio album by heavy metal guitarist The Great Kat.

Track listing
All songs by The Great Kat

 "Metal Messiah" — 2:58
 "Kat Possessed" — 2:44
 "Death to You" — 2:13
 "Satan Goes to Church" — 3:05
 "Worship Me or Die" — 2:02
 "Demons" — 2:46
 "Speed Death" — 2:38
 "Kill the Mothers" — 2:43
 "Ashes to Dust" — 4:08
 "Satan Says" — 2:57
 "Metal Massacre" — 1:57

Personnel

Band members
The Great Kat - guitars, vocals, violin
Tom Von Doom - bass
Adam Killa - drums

References

1987 debut albums
The Great Kat albums